Sir Ambrose Macdonald Poynter (26 September 1867 – 31 May 1923) was a British calligrapher, artist and architect.

Poynter was born at 24 Gower Street, Bloomsbury, London. He was eldest son of Sir Edward John Poynter (1836–1919), and grandson of architect Ambrose Poynter (1796–1886). His mother was Agnes (1843–1906), one of the famed Macdonald sisters.

Poynter designed the Torre Monumental in Retiro, Buenos Aires,  that was opened in 1916 and from his teens produced a number of drawings, some of which are now located in the British Museum.

References

19th-century English architects
20th-century English architects
1867 births
1923 deaths
People from Bloomsbury
British calligraphers
Artists' Rifles soldiers
Río de la Plata
Architects from London